The 1928 United States presidential election in Illinois took place on November 6, 1928, as part of the 1928 United States presidential election. State voters chose 29 representatives, or electors, to the Electoral College, who voted for president and vice president.

Election information
The primaries and general elections coincided with those for House as well as those for state offices.

Background
A strongly Democratic state during the Second Party System, Illinois became Republican-leaning after the American Civil War due to a combination of strong Free Soil Party heritage amongst its Yankee northern counties with the wartime conversion of some Virginian-settled rock-ribbed Democratic Southern Illinois counties to Unionist Republicanism à la Appalachia. Between the Civil War and World War I, partisanship in Illinois – like in the Border States – largely re-fought the war, with the result that although the Democratic Party gained at least 43 percent of the statewide vote via Southern and German Catholic support in every election up to 1900, they never gained an absolute majority and carried the state's electoral votes only in 1892.

Due to the Democratic Party's growing Populist and prohibitionist leanings, a decline in Democratic support after 1900 in its German Central Illinois strongholds transformed Illinois into a powerfully Republican state at all levels. Even Woodrow Wilson in 1912 when the GOP was mortally divided carried the state by only a very narrow margin, and in 1920 hostility to the League of Nations and the perceived anti-German bias of both outgoing President Wilson and new Democratic nominee and former Ohio Governor James M. Cox – the latter of whom had banned German-language instruction in Ohio schools – meant Harding carried Illinois by over 42 percentage points and the state was his sixth strongest in a national landslide. Thirteen German Catholic or southern-settled counties went Republican for the first time.

In 1924, Calvin Coolidge maintained Harding's dominance despite losing substantial German Catholic and Mississippi Valley industrial support to Progressive Wisconsin Senator Robert M. La Follette, whose family would endorse Catholic New York City Democrat Al Smith after the patriarch died in 1925.

Turnout
The total vote in the state-run primary elections (Democratic and Republican) was 1,228,537.

The total vote in the general election was 3,107,489.

Primaries
Both major parties held non-binding state-run preferential primaries on April 12.

Democratic

The 1928 Illinois Democratic presidential primary was held on April 10, 1928 in the U.S. state of Illinois as one of the Democratic Party's state primaries ahead of the 1928 presidential election.

The popular vote was a non-binding "beauty contest". Delegates were instead elected by direct votes by congressional district on delegate candidates.

Al Smith easily won the primary, and was virtually unopposed for the Democratic nomination, with most other prominent Democrats standing out as they felt they had no hope of winning the general election.

Republican

The 1928 Illinois Republican presidential primary was held on April 10, 1928 in the U.S. state of Illinois as one of the Republican Party's state primaries ahead of the 1928 presidential election.

The preference vote was a "beauty contest". Delegates were instead selected by direct-vote in each congressional districts on delegate candidates.

The preference vote was won nearly unanimously by the only name on ballot, favorite son, Secretary of Commerce Frank Lowden.

General election
Despite some predictions of an upheaval during April Hoover was easily nominated as the Republican candidate. Smith was nominated as the Democratic candidate.

After the nominations were finalized, some critics felt Smith might have a chance of carrying electoral-vote-rich Illinois due to opposition to Hoover in the Farm Belt; however by the end of June Hoover asserted that the farm vote was safe after Lowden's supporters decided to aid the GOP nominee.

Hoover campaigned in Illinois after reports early in July suggested the popularity of Smith's “wet” stand in Chicago made his win in this traditionally Republican state doubtful. Smith did not visit the state during the summer, but relied on campaigning by members of the state Democratic ticket led by Thomas S. Donovan, mainly in Chicago but also in the Metro East region. During September, Donovan and the Democrats intensified their campaign in both liberal and anti-Prohibition Chicago and “dry” downstate Illinois.

At the end of the summer, the state was confused and few trends were apparent in early polling, with Republicans in metropolitan Chicago quarreling bitterly. However, by the end of September it was clear that religion was the paramount issue in the campaign and that it was driving Chicago toward Smith and the rest of the state toward Hoover (Smith was the first Catholic nominated by a major party for president).

Despite earlier doubts, the earliest poll by Literary Digest showed Hoover carrying Illinois by a two-to-one majority; however, increased registration in Cook County made the early Literary Digest polls seem dubious, and Hoover was winning only by five-to-three in the next poll in the second week of October, and only by twelve percentage points in the third week – at a time when Hoover was leading in 42 of 48 states. As things turned out, this last poll proved accurate.

Smith would give his final Chicago campaign speech on October 17.

Results
Hoover carried Illinois by a 14-point margin, which was nonetheless a major decline upon the two preceding elections and the first time Illinois had voted more Democratic than the nation at-large since Stephen A. Douglas in 1860. Smith did make major gains in heavily Catholic Chicago – despite reservations from the city's large Polish-American population about his Irish and Tammany background – but he failed to carry Cook County despite doubling Davis’ 1924 vote share. In the most heavily anti-Catholic areas – Scandinavian Rockford and Ozark Bible Belt-influenced Southern Illinois – the GOP vote held firm or rose and this was enough to ensure Smith had no chance of carrying the state.

Results by county

See also
 United States presidential elections in Illinois

References

1928 Illinois elections
Illinois
1928